The flora of Peru is very diverse.

Jungle flora
The animals rainforests of Peru are the homes of many different species of trees as well as Orchidaceae flowering plants. Other plants found in the Peruvian jungles include:

Swietenia mahagoni
Cedar
Rubber trees
Cinchona
Vanilla
Sarsaparilla
Lycaste
Acacallis
Cattleya
Dracula orchid
Epidendrum
Oncidium